The Trump fake electors plot involved a scheme devised after the 2020 United States presidential election by former president Donald Trump and his allies in seven key states to create and submit fraudulent certificates of ascertainment that falsely asserted Trump had won the electoral college vote in those states. The intent of the scheme was to pass the fraudulent certificates to then-vice president Mike Pence in the hope he would count them, rather than the authentic certificates, and thus overturn Joe Biden's victory. This effort was predicated on a fringe legal theory outlined by Trump attorney John Eastman in the Eastman memos, which claimed the vice president has constitutional discretion to swap out official electors with an alternate slate during the certification process, thus changing the outcome of the electoral college vote and the overall winner of the presidential race. This scheme came to be known as the Pence Card.

Trump personal attorney Rudy Giuliani coordinated the scheme across the seven states. Trump, Eastman, and Giuliani spoke to some 300 Republican state legislators in an effort to persuade them to convene special legislative sessions to replace legitimate Biden electors with fake Trump electors; dozens of those legislators asked Pence to delay the election certification for that purpose. Trump pressured the Justice Department to falsely announce it had found election fraud, and he attempted to install a new acting attorney general who had drafted a letter falsely asserting such election fraud had been found in an attempt to persuade the Georgia legislature to convene and reconsider its Biden electoral votes.

Trump and Eastman asked Republican National Committee chair Ronna McDaniel to enlist the committee's assistance in gathering fake "contingent" electors. A senator's aide tried to pass fraudulent certificates to Pence minutes before the vice president was to certify the election. The scheme was one of many elements in the attempts to overturn the 2020 United States presidential election and is being investigated by the Justice Department and the January 6 committee. The January 6 committee's final report identified Trump lawyer Kenneth Chesebro as the plot's actual architect.

The Justice Department is investigating Trump's role in the events. Testimony has revealed that Trump was fully aware of the fake electors plan, and knew that Eastman's plan for Pence to obstruct the certification of electoral votes was a violation of the Electoral Count Act.

Origins 

The New York Times reported in February 2022 that plans for an "alternate electors" strategy were underway within two weeks after the election. The Times reported that two memos were sent from attorney Kenneth Chesebro to attorney James Troupis, who represented the Trump campaign in Wisconsin. The first memo, dated November 18, laid out the general approach. The second memo, dated December 9, outlined state-specific instructions on how to legally appoint alternate electors in Wisconsin, and provided the exact format for the false documents they should sign. The memos came to the attention of Giuliani, Eastman and others as a broader strategy unfolded.

On the day after the election, White House chief of staff Mark Meadows received a text message calling for an "aggressive strategy" of having the Republican-led legislatures of three uncalled states "just send their own electors to vote and have it go to the [Supreme Court]." The message was reportedly sent by Trump's secretary of energy, Rick Perry.

On November 5, Donald Trump Jr. sent a text message to Meadows outlining paths to subvert the Electoral College process and ensure his father a second term. He wrote, "It's very simple. We have multiple paths. We control them all. We have operational control. Total leverage. Moral high ground. POTUS must start second term now." Trump Jr. continued, "Republicans control 28 states Democrats 22 states. Once again Trump wins," adding, "We either have a vote WE control and WE win OR it gets kicked to Congress 6 January 2021." Biden had not yet been declared the winner at the time of the text.

Congressman Andy Biggs sent a text message to Meadows on November 6, asking about efforts to encourage Republican legislators in certain states to send alternate slates of electors, to which Meadows replied, "I love it."

Senator Mike Lee and Meadows exchanged a series of text messages. On November 8, he wrote, "Sidney Powell is saying that she needs to get in to see the president, but she's being kept away from him. Apparently she has a strategy to keep things alive and put several states back in play. Can you help her get in?" Two days later he texted Meadows that he found Powell to be "a straight shooter," though he raised doubts about her to Meadows after her November 19 press conference during which she described elaborate conspiracy theories. Lee sent a text to Meadows on December 8 stating, "If a very small handful of states were to have their legislatures appoint alternative slates of delegates, there could be a path," to which Meadows replied, "I am working on that as of yesterday."

On November 9, Ginni Thomas, wife of Supreme Court Justice Clarence Thomas, emailed 29 Arizona lawmakers, including assembly speaker Russell Bowers and Shawnna Bolick, encouraging them to pick "a clean slate of Electors" and telling them that the responsibility was "yours and yours alone".

On January 5, congressman Jim Jordan forwarded to Meadows a text message he had received from Joseph Schmitz, a Trump 2016 campaign foreign policy advisor. Schmitz wrote that on January 6 Pence "should call out all electoral votes that he believes are unconstitutional as no electoral votes at all." Schmitz was previously a Bush administration Pentagon inspector general and a Blackwater executive.

Jeffrey Clark, the Assistant Attorney General for the Environment and Natural Resources Division, was introduced to Trump by Republican congressman Scott Perry. Clark and Perry discussed a plan for Clark to draft a letter to Georgia officials stating the DOJ had "identified significant concerns that may have impacted the outcome of the election in multiple States," urging the Georgia legislature to convene a special session for the "purpose of considering issues pertaining to the appointment of Presidential Electors." Clark presented the draft letter to acting attorney general Jeffrey Rosen and his deputy Richard Donoghue for their signatures; they rejected the proposal and the letter was never sent.

Rosen and Donoghue also resisted pressure from Trump to announce the DOJ had found election fraud; attorney general Bill Barr had resigned days earlier after announcing that no election fraud of consequence had been found, telling Trump that allegations he and his associates espoused were "bullshit." Rosen and Donoghue declined Trump's request to "Just say that the election was corrupt + leave the rest to me and the R. Congressmen," according to notes Donoghue took during a phone call with the president. The continuing resistance culminated in an Oval Office meeting during which Trump proposed replacing Rosen with Clark, which was abandoned when Rosen advised the president that the proposal would trigger mass resignations at the DOJ.

The House select committee on the January 6 attack concluded that Rudy Giuliani and Mark Meadows were involved in the early stages of the plan—as was Donald Trump, who asked on December 7 or 8 for research into whether a fake elector scheme would be possible, according to Trump campaign lawyer Joshua Findlay in his testimony to the committee.

Sometime between late-November and mid-December, the White House Counsel's Office reviewed the plans to use alternate electors and deemed them not legally sound.

In July 2022, Politico acquired an email that OANN anchor Christina Bobb sent to several Trump attorneys and allies. The email was dated December 13, 2020, the day before electors met across the country to certify their states' election results. It showed a Trump campaign official had spoken with teams around the country focused on the effort to appoint false electors, reported developments back to her, which she then relayed to the email recipients. Those recipients included Giuliani, Jenna Ellis, Boris Epshteyn and one-time Trump attorneys Joe diGenova and his wife Victoria Toensing.

The New York Times obtained dozens of emails in July 2022 showing communications about the scheme among Trump associates in December 2020. The emails showed discussions of how to create lists of people who could baselessly claim to be electors in key states Trump had lost. One attorney in the detailed discussions, Jack Wilenchik, described to Epshteyn a strategy of "sending in 'fake' electoral votes to Pence so that 'someone' in Congress can make an objection when they start counting votes, and start arguing that the 'fake' votes should be counted." Wilenchik repeatedly referred to these electors as "fake," later suggesting they be referred to as "alternative," appending a smiley emoji.

One email informed many of the president's top advisers that naming Trump fake electors in Michigan was not possible due to the state Capitol building being closed due to pandemic restrictions. The emails showed that progress reports on the scheme were routed to Giuliani, and in one case to Meadows. Many of the emails went to Epshteyn, a close Trump advisor who was acting as a coordinator between people in the campaign, the White House and others. Epshteyn was also a regular point of contact for Eastman. The emails showed that Mike Roman played a significant role in finding ways to challenge the election results. Wilenchik wrote of a strategy by Kelli Ward, the Arizona Republican Party chair, "to keep it under wraps until Congress counts the vote Jan. 6th (so we can try to 'surprise' the Dems and media with it) — I tend to agree with her."

Events in individual states 

On December 14, in accordance with law, the local electors of the electoral college met in each state capital and in the District of Columbia and formalized Biden's victory, with 306 electoral votes cast for Biden and 232 electoral votes cast for Trump. On the same day that the true electors voted, at the direction of Trump campaign officials, "alternate slates" of Republican electors convened in seven states where Biden had won by a relatively small margin (Arizona, Georgia, Michigan, Nevada, New Mexico, Wisconsin, and Pennsylvania) to sign false certificates of ascertainment.

The Arizona Republican Party posted on its Twitter account a video of party members signing the certificates and issued a press release. In another case a group of Republican activists claiming to be electors were filmed demanding entry to the Michigan State Capitol, but were barred entry by building security. In each case the false electors signed a facsimile of an Electoral College certificate of ascertainment, proclaiming Trump and Pence the victors, and sent it to the National Archives and to Congress. The document made in Arizona had a facsimile of the state seal.

The alternate elector certificates for Pennsylvania and New Mexico contained language indicating they would take effect only if the Trump campaign's challenges to the election results were sustained by the courts; but "alternate" certificates from the other five states contained no indication that they were not genuine. The Trump campaign initially resisted that qualifying language in the Pennsylvania certificate, but ultimately acquiesced to its inclusion. These self-proclaimed electors have no legal standing, and the National Archives did not accept their documents, publishing the official (Biden) results from those states as the result of the election.

Later developments 
The "alternate slates" were part of the White House plan for contesting the election. As Trump advisor Stephen Miller described on television on December 14, the alternate electors were intended to replace those electors certified by their respective states based on election results. The strategy was explicitly spelled out in the John Eastman memo: the existence of "competing" slates of electors was intended to provide justification for Congress to disallow the results from the seven states. All of the alternate elector certificates were prepared with similar language, formatting, and fonts, as reported, thus indicating that the state actions were coordinated. The Washington Post and CNN reported in January 2022 that Giuliani led Trump campaign officials in coordinating the plan across the seven states.

Trump ally Boris Epshteyn and others asserted creating alternate certificates of ascertainment was a contingency similar to the 1960 presidential election, in which two slates of electors were prepared pending results of a late recount of ballots in Hawaii. Both parties agreed to that recount, which ultimately resulted in John F. Kennedy winning the state, though the outcome of the election did not hinge on the Hawaii results. By contrast, in the case of the 2020 election, the stated need for slates of alternate electors in multiple states was predicated on persistent false claims of nationwide election fraud. Epshteyn asserted the slates of alternate electors were not fraudulent and "it is not against the law, it is according to the law." He was among the members of a Trump team present in a Willard Hotel "command center" that sought to prevent Pence from certifying Biden's election on January 6.

On December 13, 2020, Robert Sinners, the campaign's election operations director for Georgia, emailed state Republicans planning to cast alternate electors for Trump. Sinners wrote: "Your duties are imperative to ensure the end resulta win in Georgia for President Trumpbut will be hampered unless we have complete secrecy and discretion." The email surfaced in June 2022.

On December 22, Ivan Raiklin, an associate of Michael Flynn and a former special forces officer who presented himself as a constitutional attorney, tweeted to Trump a two-page memo entitled, "Operation Pence Card," describing how the vice president might reject electors from states Biden won and in which Trump alleged fraud. Trump retweeted the Raiklin tweet.

ABC News chief Washington correspondent Jonathan Karl reported that on New Year's Eve 2020, White House chief of staff Mark Meadows sent a memo drafted by Trump attorney Jenna Ellis to a top Pence aide containing a detailed plan to overturn the election results. The plan entailed Pence returning the electoral results to six battleground states on January 6, with a deadline of January 15 for the states to return them. If any state did not return their electoral slate by that date, neither Trump nor Biden would hold a majority, so the election would be thrown to the House for a vote to determine the winner. Per the Constitution, in such a scenario the vote would be conducted on the basis of party control of state legislatures, with Republicans holding 26 of 50, presumably giving Trump the victory.

On January 2, 2021, Trump, Giuliani, Eastman and others held a conference call with some 300 legislators of key states to provide them purported evidence of election fraud to justify calling special sessions of their legislatures in an attempt to decertify their slates of Biden electors. Three days later, dozens of lawmakers from five key states wrote Pence to ask him to delay the January 6 final certification of electors for ten days to allow legislators the opportunity to reconsider their states' certifications.

Politico reported in July 2022 that Mike Roman, Trump's 2020 director of election day operations, delivered the fraudulent certificates to Matt Stroia, the then-chief of staff for congressman Mike Kelly. Stroia then directed a colleague to distribute copies on Capitol Hill. Kelly said Stroia had received the certificates but denied any involvement of his office in their distribution. Kelly was a Trump ally in the effort to overturn the 2020 election. The January 6 committee disclosed during a June 2022 hearing that Sean Riley, a top aide to senator Ron Johnson, attempted to submit fraudulent elector certificates through a top Pence aide minutes before the vice president was to certify the election results, but was rebuffed; Johnson said his office received the certificates from Kelly's office.

Despite assumptions about Eastman's role, the January 6 committee's final report, which was released on December 22, 2022, named lesser known Trump lawyer Kenneth Chesebro as the plot's original proponent.

Aftermath 
In early 2021 the watchdog group American Oversight obtained copies of the false documents from the National Archives via a Freedom of Information request; they published them on their website in March 2021. However, the documents were largely overlooked until the story was reported by Politico reporter Nicholas Wu in January 2022. Michigan attorney general Dana Nessel announced in January 2022 that after a months-long investigation into the Michigan certificate she had asked the Justice Department to open a criminal investigation, closing the Michigan investigation. Deputy attorney general Lisa Monaco days later confirmed the Justice Department was examining the matter. Nessel announced in January 2023 that she was reopening her investigation "because I don't know what the federal government plans to do."

On June 22, 2022, the Justice Department issued subpoenas to Georgia Republican Party chair David Shafer and another party official who allegedly signed a document claiming to be Trump electors, and to a Virginia man who worked on the Trump campaign's efforts in Arizona and New Mexico. Other alleged false Trump electors in Michigan also received subpoenas, though it was not clear whether they were federal or state; Michigan attorney general Dana Nessel had also been investigating the fraudulent elector scheme.

The FBI also served a search warrant on Nevada Republican party chair Michael McDonald, and sought to serve a warrant on party secretary James DeGraffenreid; both men had signed a fraudulent certificate of ascertainment. FBI agents interviewed Sam DeMarco, chair of the Allegheny County, Pennsylvania Republican party, at his home the next day. Politico reported concurrently that Arizona Republican chair Kelli Ward and her husband had also been subpoenaed, but did not specify when. By July 2022, Fulton County, Georgia district attorney Fani Willis had notified sixteen Republicans that they were "targets" of her criminal investigation.

During its fourth public hearing, the January 6 committee presented a video excerpt of a deposition from Republican National Committee chair Ronna McDaniel. She revealed that Trump was fully aware of the fake electors plan, as he and Eastman had called her to enlist the committee's assistance to "gather these contingent electors, in case any of the legal challenges that were ongoing changed the result of any of the states."

The committee also heard testimony from Greg Jacob, counsel for Mike Pence, "that Mr. Eastman admitted in the Jan. 4 Oval Office meetingwith Mr. Trump presentthat his plan to have Mr. Pence obstruct the electoral certification violated the Electoral Count Act."

The Washington Post reported on July 26, 2022, that the Justice Department was examining Trump's role in its investigation. Prosecutors had  asked grand jury witnesses hours of detailed questions about conversations between Trump, his attorneys and others about the scheme. Pence's former chief of staff Marc Short and counsel Gregory Jacob, who had attended an Oval Office meeting during which Eastman presented his Pence Card scheme but advised Pence to reject it, had recently testified before the grand jury. The Smith special counsel investigation, established in November 2022, also examined the fake electors scheme.

See also 
 Attempts to overturn the 2020 United States presidential election
 Democratic backsliding in the United States
 Donald Trump's false claims of a stolen election
 Public hearings of the United States House Select Committee on the January 6 Attack

References 

Controversies of the 2020 United States presidential election
Donald Trump controversies
Confidence tricks
Electoral fraud in the United States